Chengbei is one of four districts of the prefecture-level city of Xining, the capital of Qinghai Province, Northwest China, covering part of the northern portion of the city as its name suggests.

Subdivisions
 Chaoyang Subdistrict
 Xiaoqiao Street Subdistrict
 Mafang Subdistrict
 Baoziwan
 Nianlipu

See also
 List of administrative divisions of Qinghai

References

External links

County-level divisions of Qinghai
Xining